The Van Mildert Professor of Divinity is one of the oldest chairs at Durham University. The chair is named in honour of Bishop William Van Mildert, one of the founders of the university. The holder of the Van Mildert chair, which is jointly funded by the university and Durham Cathedral, is also a residentiary canon at the cathedral and member of its Chapter, thus one of the requirements of post holder is to be an Anglican priest or a minister in another church in communion with Church of England.

The current Van Mildert Professor of Divinity is Simon Oliver, who took up the appointment in 2015.

List of Van Mildert professors
 The Rev Canon Professor D. Dawson-Walker (1919 – 1934); former Principal of St John's College, Durham
 The Rev Canon Professor Michael Ramsey (1940 – 1950), later Archbishop of Canterbury 
 The Rev Canon Professor Stanley Lawrence Greenslade (1950 – 1958) 
 The Rev Canon Professor Henry Ernest William 'Hugh' Turner (1958 – 73)
 The Rt Rev Professor  Stephen Sykes (1974 – 1985) 
 The Rev Canon Professor Daniel W. Hardy (1986 – 1990)
 The Rev Canon Professor David Brown FBA, FRSE (1990 – 2007)
 The Rev Canon Mark McIntosh (2009 – 2014)
 The Rev Canon Professor Simon Oliver (2015 – present)

See also
 Lightfoot Professor of Divinity
 Bede Professor of Catholic Theology

References

Divinity, Van Mildert
Divinity, Van Mildert